Enteromius lufukiensis is a species of ray-finned fish in the  family Cyprinidae.
It is found in Burundi and Democratic Republic of the Congo.
Its natural habitat is rivers but it is becoming rare due to habitat loss.

References

Sources

Enteromius
Taxa named by George Albert Boulenger
Fish described in 1917
Taxonomy articles created by Polbot